Stream of Passion is a Dutch progressive metal band with symphonic and gothic influences founded by guitarist and composer Arjen Anthony Lucassen and Mexican singer, violinist, and lyricist Marcela Bovio. They have released four studio albums.

In 2007, Lucassen left the band to continue on his own as he had originally planned, together with his girlfriend guitarist Lori Linstruth, and keyboardist Alejandro Millán; Bovio, her boyfriend (later husband) and bassist Johan van Stratum and producer Joost van den Broek handling the composition duties afterwards. After keeping a steady line-up since 2009, the band announced in April 2016 that they would disband, wanting to end on a high note rather than letting the interest and inspiration fade away, after a live album entitled Memento and a final show on 28 December 2016.

History
Lucassen and Bovio had previously collaborated in Ayreon's album The Human Equation, for which Bovio (then in band Elfonía) was selected by Lucassen via an internet female singing contest. Lucassen then decided to create a new band with her as lead vocalist, and selected other little-known musicians to form the rest of the band: van Stratum, keyboardist Alejandro Millán (from Elfonía as well), guitarist Lori Linstruth, and drummer Davy Mickers. Because the musicians in the band lived thousands of miles apart, Lucassen composed the group's 2005 debut album, Embrace the Storm, over the Internet, with Bovio writing all the lyrics. A live album, Live in the Real World, featuring songs from Lucassen's other projects Ayreon and Star One, was released the following year.

In 2007, half of the Stream of Passion's line-up decided to leave: Lucassen left to make them continue their own career as he had planned since the creation, while Linstruth and Millán also decided to quit. The three were respectively replaced by Hazebroek, Schultz, and Revet. After the release in 2009 of the band's first album without Lucassen on composition, The Flame Within, Mickers decided to leave the band, with Bovio and van Stratum being the only original members left. He was replaced by Peters who featured on the band's third album in 2011, Darker Days.

In 2012 Stream of Passion left Napalm Records and decided to become an independent band, launching an Indiegogo campaign to finance their fourth full studio album.  The new album, A War of Our Own, was released on 18 April 2014.

In April of 2016 the band announced via Facebook that they would be separating at the end of the year, saying "Over the past eleven years we've had the time of our lives playing in stages all over the world and sharing moments of joy on stage. But all good things come to an end, and we feel it's time to move on and search for new musical challenges. We're proud of everything we've achieved, with your help, and we want to end the band history on a high note instead of losing focus, interest and drive. Before parting ways as a band we will perform a few goodbye shows; we also want to record a DVD to serve as a memento of the good times we've had. [...] Once again, we'd like to express our eternal gratitude for the support you've given us all these years. All of us will continue to make music, one way or the other; so we still hope to see you soon on a stage near you. Thank you for being part of the wonderful adventure that has been Stream of Passion!"

The band released a live album entitled Memento and performed a final show on 28 December 2016.

After the split-up, bassist Johan van Stratum and singer Marcela Bovio became part of the line-up for progressive metal band VUUR, but Bovio left the band before its debut release after she and fellow VUUR singer Anneke van Giersbergen realized they wanted to approach the vocals in different ways.

In October 2022 the band announced that they were reforming for a show in September 2023. They later announced a second show to be played the same month, as well as the upcoming release of an EP of newly recorded material.

Personnel 

Lineup
Marcela Bovio - lead vocals, violin (2005–2016, 2022–present)
Johan van Stratum - bass (2005–2016, 2022–present)
Eric Hazebroek - lead/rhythm guitar (2007–2016, 2022–present)
Stephan Schultz - lead/rhythm guitar (2007–2016, 2022–present)
Jeffrey Revet - keyboards, synthesizers, piano (2007–2016, 2022–present)
Martijn Peters - drums (2009–2016, 2022–present)
Other members
Arjen Anthony Lucassen - lead/rhythm guitar, keyboards, backing vocals (2005–2007)
Lori Linstruth - lead/rhythm guitar (2005–2007)
Alejandro Millán - keyboards, piano, live backing vocals (2005–2007)
Davy Mickers - drums (2005–2009)
Session members
Damian Wilson - vocals, acoustic guitar (live, 2006)
Diana Bovio - backing vocals (live, 2006–2007)
Joost van den Broek - production, mixing, mastering, songwriting (studio, 2009-2016)
André Borgman - drums (live, 2009)

Timeline

Discography 
Studio albums
Embrace the Storm (2005)
The Flame Within (2009)
Darker Days (2011)
A War of Our Own (2014)
Live albums
Live in the Real World (2006) (CD and DVD)
Memento (2016) (DVD)
Singles
"Out in the Real World" (2006) – No. 49* NL Singles Top 100
"I Have a Right" (2015) – from A Tribute to Sonata Arctica

References

External links

Official band website
 Interview with Arjen on Lebmetal.com October 2009

Dutch progressive metal musical groups
Dutch symphonic metal musical groups
Musical groups established in 2005
Musical groups disestablished in 2016
Dutch gothic metal musical groups
Arjen Anthony Lucassen
Napalm Records artists
2005 establishments in the Netherlands
2016 disestablishments in the Netherlands
Inside Out Music artists